Jill Kristen Johnson (born June 8, 1969), later known by her married name Jill Chasson, is an American former competition swimmer who participated in the 1992 Summer Olympics in Barcelona, Spain.  She competed in the B Final of the women's 200-meter breaststroke event, and finished with the fourteenth-best time overall (2:33.89).

See also
 List of Stanford University people

References

1969 births
Living people
American female breaststroke swimmers
Olympic swimmers of the United States
People from Lutherville, Maryland
Stanford Cardinal women's swimmers
Swimmers at the 1992 Summer Olympics
20th-century American women